These are the late night schedules for the four United States broadcast networks that offer programming during this time period, starting September 2017. All times are Eastern or Pacific. Affiliates will fill non-network schedule with local, syndicated, or paid programming. Affiliates also have the option to preempt or delay network programming at their discretion.

Schedule

Monday-Friday Overnights

Saturday overnights

By network

ABC

Returning series
ABC World News Now
Jimmy Kimmel Live!
Nightline

CBS

Returning series
CBS Overnight News
The Late Show with Stephen Colbert
The Late Late Show with James Corden

FOX

Returning series
Encore Programming

NBC

Returning series
Last Call with Carson Daly
Late Night with Seth Meyers
Saturday Night Live
Today With Kathie Lee and Hoda 
The Tonight Show Starring Jimmy Fallon

Not returning from 2016-17:
Mad Money

References

United States late night network television schedules
Late
Late